Jouko Alila (born 18 November 1950) is a Finnish former footballer. He competed in the men's tournament at the 1980 Summer Olympics.

He played 144 games and scored 23 goals in Mestaruussarja representing MiPK and KTP. He also played in second and third tiers for KTP and for Kotkan Kisailijat.

References

External links
 

1950 births
Living people
Finnish footballers
Finland international footballers
Olympic footballers of Finland
Footballers at the 1980 Summer Olympics
People from Muhos
Association football forwards
Sportspeople from North Ostrobothnia